The 2011 South Kesteven District Council election took place on 5 May 2011 to elect members of South Kesteven District Council in Lincolnshire, England. The whole council was up for election and the Conservative party stayed in overall control of the council.

Election result
The Conservatives remained in control of the council after gaining seats from the Liberal Democrats. These gains included taking all three seats in St Johns ward, as well as a seat each in All Saints and St Georges wards. Labour also made gains to move to six councillors, while the number of independents dropped.

The election in Deeping St James was delayed from the original date after the death of a Liberal Democrat councillor for the ward.

The above totals include the delayed election in Deeping St. James.

Ward results

Deeping St James delayed election
The election in Deeping St James was delayed until 23 June 2011 after the death of the Liberal Democrat councillor for the ward since 1983, Ken Joynson. The Conservatives and Liberal Democrats both lost a seat, at the election, with the Conservative retaining one of the three seats. The other two seats were won by an independent and by Phil Dilks, a former Labour county councillor who stood with no party description.

By-elections between 2011 and 2015
A by-election was held in Aveland on 13 March 2014 after the resignation of Conservative councillor Debbie Wren. The seat was held for the Conservatives by Peter Moseley with a majority of 243 votes over Labour candidate John Morgan.

References

South Kesteven District Council elections
2011 English local elections